KALO (channel 38) is an independent religious television station in Honolulu, Hawaii, United States. Owned by KALO TV, Inc., the station maintains studios on Waiakamilo Road in Honolulu, and its transmitter is located in Akupu, Hawaii.

KALO, which signed on the air July 9, 1999, is one of six stations in Honolulu that air religious programming, the other five being KWHE, KAAH-TV, KWBN, KKAI and KUPU. KALO's allocation channel, like that of KWBN and PBS outlet KHET, is reserved for non-commercial educational use, and as such, the station depends on viewer donations for support.

Technical information

Subchannel

Analog-to-digital conversion
On January 15, 2009, KALO became channel 38 digital when the digital transition was completed. It is also the same virtual channel on PSIP.

On April 13, 2017, the FCC announced that KALO was relocated to RF channel 18 on June 21, 2019 as a result of the broadcast incentive auction.

References

External links

ALO
Television channels and stations established in 1999
1999 establishments in Hawaii
Religious television stations in the United States